Sagiolechia phaeospora is a species of crustose lichen in the family Sagiolechiaceae. It is found in the alpine tundra of Alaska.

Taxonomy
The lichen was described as a new species in 2020 by lichenologists Alan Fryday and Toby Spribille. The type specimen was collected from the Hoonah-Angoon Census Area in Glacier Bay National Park. The specific epithet phaeospora refers to its brownish ascospores, a feature that is unique in the genus Sagiolechia.

Description
Sagiolechia phaeospora has a thin, whitish, crustose thallus with numerous cracks and areoles. The photobiont partner of the lichen is a single-celled green alga with roundish to angular cells measuring 10–14 μm. The other species in the genus, in contrast, have trentepohloid photobionts (i.e., filamentous, multicellular green algae with a yellow to orange color). The apothecia made by the lichen are black, measuring 0.6–1.0 mm in diameter. Asci are eight-spored, with dimensions of 70–72 by 16–17 μm. The brownish ascospores are more or less muriform (i.e., divided by horizontal and vertical septa), and typically measure 17.8–18.5 by 9.5–10.6 μm. Sagiolechia phaeospora is unreactive to standard chemical spot tests.

Habitat and distribution
The lichen is known only from the type locality, where it is saxicolous on argillite rock in heath in alpine tundra.

References

Ostropales
Lichens described in 2020
Lichens of Subarctic America
Taxa named by Toby Spribille
Fungi without expected TNC conservation status
Lichen species